Decimus Rusticus (sometimes Rusticus Decimus) of Treves (then Augusta Treverorum) and Lyon (Lugdunum) (c. 370 – before 423) was a Master of the Offices and the praetorian prefect of Gaul between 409 and 410 or 413. He was one of those responsible for the withdrawal from Britannia.

Life
In 407, the Roman army in Britain chose as their leader Flavius Claudius Constantinus. He crossed the Channel to the continent, and by May 408 had made Arles his capital, where he appointed Apollinaris, grandfather of Sidonius Apollinaris, as prefect. Decimus Rusticus succeeded his friend Apollinaris, as praetorian prefect of Gaul in 409.

He was captured by the army commanders of Emperor Honorius and put to death. 

About him, Sidonius Apollinaris to his friend Aquilinus:

I find it certainly to my advantage, friend capable of every virtue, and I trust you will feel the same, that we should have as many ties to bind us as we have reasons for being united. Such ties are hereditary in our families; I do but recall the experience of the past. Let me summon as my witnesses our grandfathers Rusticus and Apollinaris, whom like fortunes and aversions united in a noble friendship. They had a similar taste in letters, their characters were alike; they had enjoyed similar dignities and undergone the same dangers. They were equally agreed in detesting the inconstancy of Constantine, the irresolution of Jovinus, the perfidy of Gerontius; both singling out the fault proper to each person, and both finding in Dardanus the sum of all existing vices.

If we come down to the years between their time and our own, we find our fathers brought up together from their tender youth until they came to manhood. In Honorius' reign, as tribunes and secretaries, they served abroad together in such close comradeship that among all the grounds of their agreement the fact that their own fathers had been friends appeared to be the least. Under Valentinian, one of the two ruled all Gaul, the other only a region of it; even so they managed to balance their dignities with a fraternal equilibrium; the one who held the lower rank had seniority in office. And now the old tradition comes down to us grandsons, whose dearest care it should be to prevent the affection of our parents and our forefathers from suffering any diminution in our persons. But there are ties of all kinds, over and above that of this hereditary friendship, which needs must bring us close together; we are linked by equality of years no less than by identity of birthplace; we played and learned together, shared the same discipline and relaxation, and were trained by the same rule. So then, for what remains of life now that our years touch upon the threshold of age, let us under the providence of God be two persons with but a single mind; and let us instil into our sons the same mutual regard: let us see that the objects which they desire and refuse, pursue or shun, are the same. It would indeed crown our vows if the boys who bear the honoured names of Rusticus and Apollinaris renewed within their breasts the hearts of those illustrious ancestors. Farewell.

Marriage and descendants

He married before 400 Artemia (b. c. 375), the daughter of Artemia of Clermont-Ferrand (then Augustonemetum) in Auvergne (Arvennia) (born say 355), and they were the parents of a son (b. c. 400), who was a Vicarius of a province in Gaul under the father of Sidonius Apollinaris between 423 and 448.

This son then married Tullia of Lyon (born say 410), daughter of Eucherius of Lyon and wife Gallia(?), and they were the parents of Aquilinus (c. 430 – c. 470), a nobleman at Lyon, schoolfellow and friend of Sidonius Apollinaris and the father of St. Viventiolus and his brother St. Rusticus, Archbishop of Lyon.

Sources and references
 Bishop of Tours Gregory, Historia Francorum (The History of the Franks) (London, England: Penguin Books, Ltd., 1974).
 Sidonius Apollinaris, The Letters of Sidonius (Oxford: Clarendon, 1915) (orig.), pp. clx-clxxxiii; List of Correspondents, Notes, V.ix.1.

References

370 births
5th-century deaths
Year of birth uncertain
Year of death unknown
4th-century Gallo-Roman people
5th-century Gallo-Roman people
Praetorian prefects of Gaul